Financial assistance or financial aid can refer to:
Financial assistance (share purchase), assistance given by a company for the purchase of its shares or those of its holding companies
Funding of science, the provision of financing for scientific research projects
Welfare, financial aid primarily by governmental institutions or charitable organizations to individuals in need
Subsidy
Student financial aid, funding intended to help students pay educational expenses
Bailout, financial support to a company or country which faces serious financial difficulty
Bursary, a monetary award made by an institution to individuals or groups of people who cannot afford to pay full fees

Assistance